Committee on Veterans' Affairs can refer to:
 United States House Committee on Veterans' Affairs
 United States Senate Committee on Veterans' Affairs

American military personnel